Vaticana (minor planet designation: 416 Vatigana) is a large Main belt asteroid.

It was discovered by Auguste Charlois on 4 May 1896 in Nice.

References

External links
 
 

Background asteroids
Vaticana
Vaticana
S-type asteroids (Tholen)
Sl-type asteroids (SMASS)
18960504